Loram Maintenance of Way, Inc.  is a railroad maintenance equipment and services provider. Loram provides track maintenance services to freight, passenger, and transit railroads worldwide, as well as sells and leases equipment which performs these functions.

Corporate history 
Loram Maintenance of Way was founded in 1954 in Hamel, Minnesota, in the United States by Canadian businessman Fred C. Mannix. The company name is an abbreviation of the phrase "long-range Mannix".

Loram initially acted as a contractor for railways, cleaning ballast on track beds. The rough edges of ballast rock not only supports the ties and holds them in place, it helps water drain away from the track bed. Over time, ballast becomes clogged with earth, weeds, and debris, inhibiting its drainage properties. Its major competitor in this field was Speno Rail Services (later owned by Pandrol-Jackson, and still later by Harsco Technologies). Over time, Loram replaced its large work crews with automated machines which can clean ballast  in depth.

The company's first mechanical products were the Mannix Sled and Mannix Plow, both developed in the late 1950s. The Mannix Sled was a device towed behind a locomotive which raised the rails and ties and cleared the ballast between the ties (a process known as "skeletonizing"). The Mannix Sled would be followed by a work crew which manually refilled the empty space with clean ballast. The Mannix Plow was a device which lifted both rails and ties, while three blades passed below them and removed all the ballast. This left the ties and rail lying on bare earth; a large work crew followed, lifting the rails again and replacing the ballast. The concept of lifting the rails and ties was counterintuitive, but it revolutionized railbed rehabilitation. In 1959, Loram introduced the Auto-Track. Designed to work behind either a Mannix Plow or a Mannix Sled, this device was capable to detaching a damaged or broken tie from the rail and ejecting it to one side.

Loram began grinding rails in the 1970s. High rates of speed, traffic, and weight can damage rails. The burrs and cracks created can damage train wheels, slow traffic, and cause rails to degrade faster. Grinding rails in place helps to avoid these problems and lengthen rail life. While Speno had its crews living on its grinding trains, Loram did not. Its crews lived off-site while working, which meant Loram grinding vehicles were shorter and less complicated. Grinding carries with it a significant risk of fire, as sparks from the grinding process can ignite nearby vegetation. Loram's first grinders carried a caboose equipped with extensive firefighting equipment, and its crews were trained firefighters. The company later introduced an automatic firefighting system to its grinding vehicles, which eliminated the need for the firefighting caboose. About 1986, Loram introduced the SX-16, which could grind railroad switches (including switch points, frogs, and wing rails) as well as track. By 1992, Loram had more than a dozen grinders in operation in the United States. In the late 1990s, working with KLD Labs, Loram developed the VISion Transverse Analyzer (VISTA), a computer guided grinding system. The VISTA system employs lasers to identify the rail profile and any defects. The computer then chooses an optimal solution, and guides the vehicle as it grinds the rail to this profile. The system is captures removed metal and places it into a waste storage compartment rather than leaving it on the track. A variation of this vehicle, the RGI series railgrinder, was developed specifically for the international market and has been sold in Colombia, India, Mexico, and in Scandinavia.

About 1987, Loram introduced the Badger ditch digging vehicle.

Since the 1990s, Loram has also been offering rail inspection services. Loram adapts commercial consumer vehicles for use on rails, and has developed a computerized, laser inspection system which compares the rail to a pre-determined profile in order to identify damage. Each rail is identified using its Differential GPS location. The rail inspection can be used to develop a unique railgrinding plan that will adjust grindstone speed, location, and number of passes required to fix the damage and achieve a new optimal rail profile. Loram also analyzes the removed metal to evaluate rail performance and grinding results.

Loram introduced Railvac in 2000. This  car can both clean and excavate cable trenches, pole footings, railroad crossings, and railroad switches.

Acquisitions 

In 2011, Loram purchased Tranergy Corporation, manufacturer of main line and railyard track friction lubricants and lubricant dispensers and switch lubrication devices.

In 2014 Loram acquired a majority stake in, and in July 2016 fully acquired, British firm Rail Vehicle Engineering Limited (RVEL), a company based in Derby, England, which itself grew out of the collapse of FM Rail. It provides maintenance and overhaul facilities and operates specialized rolling stock. It was rebranded as Loram UK.

Current operations 
Loram provides maintenance of way services to Class I and shortline railroads, rapid transit systems, and commuter rail systems worldwide. The Railway Supply Institute said in 2015 that Loram was "one of the leading suppliers of track maintenance machinery and services in North America and the global market". Every Class I railroad in North America uses its equipment, and it is widely acknowledged to be the industry leader in grinding equipment.

Loram both leases and sells its equipment. Its leases with major customers usually last about five years.

Railgrinding remains the company's core. As of 2015, its rail grinding vehicles included the RG 400 Series (for Class I and other railroads with heavy loads and traffic); the RGI Series (an RG 400 Series modified for the international market); the C44 Series (a rail grinder sold in international markets where clearance and axle weight are restricted); the RGS Series (a specialty railgrinder used on railroad crossings and switches); and the L Series (a lightweight railgrinder used for rapid transit and specialty rail, and which can be moved by flatbed truck).

Loram UK 

References

Bibliography 

 
 
 
 

Railway infrastructure companies
Companies based in Minnesota
American companies established in 1954